Clochemerle is a 1972 BBC television serial based on the 1934 novel of the same name by Gabriel Chevallier, with Ray Galton and Alan Simpson adapting the text. Filmed on location in France, it starred Roy Dotrice, Wendy Hiller, Cyril Cusack, Kenneth Griffith, Cyd Hayman, Bernard Bresslaw, Hugh Griffith, Micheline Presle, Madeline Smith, Christian Roberts, Nigel Green, Wolfe Morris and Gordon Rollings, with narration by Peter Ustinov.

The show was made as a co-production between Britain's BBC and West Germany's Bavaria Film.

Episodes

Production
The series was shot on location in Colombier-le-Vieux, in the department of Ardèche, south of Lyon. The steam railway there, which appears in the programme, had been restored by enthusiasts the year before shooting.

Home media
It was issued as a 2-DVD set by RLJ Entertainment in 2013.

References

External links
Clochemerle (read by Andrew Sachs (1988-05-28) at the BBC Genome Project
Clochemerle at the BBC Genome Project
Clochemerle: 1: The Magnificent Idea of Barthelemy Piechut at the BBC Genome Project
Clochemerle: 1: The Magnificent Idea of Barthelemy Piechut, the Mayor at the BBC Genome Project
Clochemerle: 2: The Triumphant Inauguration of a Municipal Amenity at the BBC Genome Project
[ Clochemerle: 3: ] at the BBC Genome Project
[ Clochemerle: 4: ] at the BBC Genome Project
[ Clochemerle: 5: ] at the BBC Genome Project
[ Clochemerle: 6: ] at the BBC Genome Project
[ Clochemerle: 7: ] at the BBC Genome Project
Clochemerle: 8 : The Dreaded Arrival of Captain Tardivaux at the BBC Genome Project
Clochemerle: 9: The Glorious Triumph of Barthelemy Piechut at the BBC Genome Project

BBC television dramas
Television shows based on French novels
Television series created by Ray Galton
Television series created by Alan Simpson
1970s British drama television series